Fibroblast growth factor 8 (FGF-8) is a protein that in humans is encoded by the FGF8 gene.

Function 

The protein encoded by this gene is a member of the fibroblast growth factor (FGF) family. FGF family members possess broad mitogenic and cell survival activities, and are involved in a variety of biological processes, including embryonic development, cell growth, morphogenesis, tissue repair, tumor growth and invasion.

FGF-8 is important and necessary for setting up and maintaining the midbrain/hindbrain border (or mesencephalon/metencephalon border) which plays the vital role of “organizer” in development, like the Spemann organizer” of the gastrulating embryo. FGF-8 is expressed in the region where Otx2 and Gbx2 cross inhibit each other and is maintained expression by this interaction. Once expressed, the Fgf8 induces other transcription factors to form cross-regulatory loops between cells, thus the border is established. Through development, the Fgf8 goes to regulate the growth and differentiation of progenitor cells in this region to produce ultimate structure of midbrain and hindbrain. Crossely’s experiment proves that the FGF-8 is sufficient to induce the repatterning of midbrain and hindbrain structure.

In the development of forebrain, cortical patterning centers are the boundaries or poles of cortical primordium, where multiple BMP and WNT genes are expressed. Besides, at the anterior pole several FGF family including Fgf3, 8,17 and 18 overlap in expression. The similarity in cortical gene expression in Emx2 mutants and mice in which the anterior FGF8 source is augmented suggests that FGF8 controls the graded expression (low anterior, high posterior) of Emx2 in the cortical primordium. Emx2 is one of the protomap molecular determinants that prove to be closely interacted with Pax6. Emx2 and Pax6 are expressed in opposing gradients along the A/P axis of the cortical primordium and cooperate to set up area pattern. Fgf8 and Emx2 antagonize each other to create the development map. FGF-8 promotes the development of anterior part and suppresses posterior fate, while the Emx2 does the reverse. What's more, FGF8 manipulations suggest FGF8 controls the cortical graded expression of COUP-TF1. Moreover, the sharpness of both COUPTF1 and COUP-TF2 expression borders would be expected of genes involved in boundary specification. Thus, the interaction between them regulates the A/P axis of cortical primordium and directs the development map of cortical area.

FGF8 signaling from the apical ectodermal ridge (AER), which borders the distal end of the limb bud, is necessary for forming normal limbs. In the absence of FGF8, limb buds can be reduced in size, hypoplasia or aplasia of bones or digits within the three limb segments may occur, as well as delays in subsequent expressions of other genes (Shh or FGF4). FGF8 is responsible for cell proliferation and survival, as well. Loss of function or decreased expression could result in the malformation or absence of essential limb components. Studies have shown that the forelimbs tend to be more affected by the loss of FGF8 signaling than the hindlimbs and the loss tends to affect the proximal components more heavily than the distal components. FGF8 not only aids in the formation of the limb bud and skeletal components of the limb, but the tendons within the limb are affected by it near the portions closest to the muscle extremities. This diffusible polypeptide is responsible for inducing the limb bud, then inducing and maintaining sonic hedgehog expression in the established limb bud promoting outgrowth of the limb. Evidence for this comes from a study done by Crossley and his colleagues, in which FGF8 soaked beads were surgically used to replace AER areas with the beads. These studies showed that ectopic limbs formed either fully functional or mostly functional limbs near the normal limbs or limb areas. FGF8 has also been recorded to regulate craniofacial structure formation, including the teeth, palate, mandible, and salivary glands. Decreased expression can result in the absence of molar teeth, failure to close the palate, or decreased mandible size. 

FGF8 has been documented to play a role in oralmaxillogacial diseases and CRISPR-cas9 gene targeting on FGF8 may be key in treating these diseases. Cleft lip and/or palate (CLP) genome wide gene analysis shows a D73H missense mutation in the FGF8 gene which reduces the binding affinity of FGF8. Loss of Tbx1 and Tfap2 can result in proliferation and apoptosis in the palate cells increasing the risk of CLP. Overexpression of FGF8 due to misregulation of the Gli processing gene may result in cliliopathies. Agnathia, a malformation of the mandible, is often a lethal condition that comes from the absence of BMP4 regulators (noggin and chordin), resulting in high levels of BMP4 signaling, which in turn drastically reduces FGF8 signaling, increasing cell death during mandibular outgrowth. Lastly, the ability for FGF8 to regulate cell proliferation has caused interest in its effects on tumors or squamous cell carcinoma. CRISPR-cas9 gene targeting methods are currently being studied to determine if they are the key to solving FGF8 mutations associated with oral diseases.

Clinical significance 

This protein is known to be a factor that supports androgen and anchorage independent growth of mammary tumor cells. Overexpression of this gene has been shown to increase tumor growth and angiogenesis. The adult expression of this gene was once thought to be restricted to testes and ovaries but has been described in several organ systems. Temporal and spatial pattern of this gene expression suggests its function as an embryonic epithelial factor. Studies of the mouse and chick homologs reveal roles in midbrain and limb development, organogenesis, embryo gastrulation and left-right axis determination. The alternative splicing of this gene results in four transcript variants.

References

Further reading

External links 
 GeneReviews/NCBI/NIH/UW entry on Kallmann syndrome